Marc Pruett  (born 19 August 1951) is an American bluegrass banjo player and a founding member of the bluegrass band Balsam Range since 2007.

Early life and education
Pruett was born on 19 August 1951, and grew up in the Osborne Farm area of Haywood County, North Carolina. He graduated from Western Carolina University with a B.S. in Geology. At 15, his musical career started at Ghost Town, a theme park in Maggie Valley, North Carolina, where he played banjo and bass for park visitors.

Career
In 1973, Pruett made his first recording at Bill Monroe's festival in Bean Blossom, Indiana. Between that time and the present, Pruett has played with a number of bands, including Balsam Range, the Southern Lawmen, The Whites, Rock Springs Reunion, mountain clogging bands, and more.

Recognition
In 2010, he was granted an honorary Doctorate of Arts by Western Carolina University in Cullowhee, North Carolina "in recognition of [his] many achievements as a professional musician, and in appreciation for [his] support and love of the traditional culture of the Southern Appalachian Mountains".

Pruett is a 2016 winner of the North Carolina Heritage Award and has played with Ricky Skaggs, Balsam Range and the Marc Pruett Band

References 

1951 births
Living people
American bluegrass musicians
People from Haywood County, North Carolina
Western Carolina University alumni
Country musicians from North Carolina
Kentucky Thunder members